Paul Clavin is a French scientist at Aix-Marseille University, working in the field of combustion and statistical mechanics. He is the founder of Institute for Research on Nonequilibrium Phenomena (IRPHE).

Biography 
Clavin served as the chair of the Physical Mechanics at Institut Universitaire de France from 1993 to 2004. He received Ya.B. Zeldovich Gold Medal from The Combustion Institute in 2014 and a fellow of The Combustion Institute. A workshop titled Out-of-Equilibrium Dynamics was conducted in 2012 in honor of Clavin's 70th birthday. He is the recipient of Grand Prix award from French Academy of Sciences in 1998 and received Plumey award from Société Française de Physique in 1988. He was elected membre correspondant at the French Academy of sciences in 1997.

Books

See also

References 

Fluid dynamicists
Living people
Fellows of The Combustion Institute
Year of birth missing (living people)
University of Poitiers alumni